Hipposideros felix is a species of bat known from Miocene fossil deposits at Li Mae Long in Thailand. The holotype is a tooth, the third molar, of a hipposiderid bat with affinities to the Brachipposideros group of fossil species found in Australia and France. The first description was published in a study of mammal specimens at the fossil site that produced evidence of unknown species, including other bats. The species is only known from the Li Mae Long, a site that was determined to be a forest near an open body of water in the Miocene. The authors, Léonard Ginsburg and Pierre Mein, proposed the specific epithet felix, derived from Latin, as a reference to the regions cultural perception of a bat as a symbol of happiness and good fortune.

References 

Hipposideridae
Mammals described in 1997
Bats of Asia
Mammals of Thailand

Fossil taxa described in 1997